Lincoln station is an light rail station in Lone Tree, Colorado, United States. It is served by the E and R Lines, operated by the Regional Transportation District (RTD), and was opened on November 17, 2006. The station features a public art installation entitled Sun Stream, created by Ray King and dedicated in 2006.

Lincoln station became the terminus of the R Line upon its opening on February 24, 2017. The station served as the terminus of the Southeast Corridor until the completion of the Southeast Light Rail Extension project, which added three stations in Lone Tree that opened on May 17, 2019.

The R Line currently terminates at Lincoln station due to low ridership at Sky Ridge, Lone Tree City Center, and RidgeGate Parkway, as the area is still under construction and amid generally lower ridership due to the impact of the COVID-19 pandemic on public transport.

References 

RTD light rail stations
Railway stations in the United States opened in 2006
2006 establishments in Colorado
Transportation buildings and structures in Douglas County, Colorado